Emer Higgins (born 1985/86) is an Irish Fine Gael politician who has been a Teachta Dála (TD) for the Dublin Mid-West constituency since the 2020 general election.

She was co-opted as a member of South Dublin County Council in 2011 and continued as a councillor until her election as a TD in 2020, and worked as chief of staff of global operations for PayPal. She served as Leader of the Fine Gael group on South Dublin County Council and as Chair of the Land use, Planning and Transport SPC Strategic Policy Committee.

In 2019, she ran as the Fine Gael candidate in the 2019 Dublin Mid-West by-election where she was beaten by the Sinn Féin candidate Mark Ward.

She is a member of the Governing Authority of University College Dublin (UCD), where she went to college and graduated with a Honours Degree in Economics and Sociology. She also worked for a period of five years as an aide to Frances Fitzgerald.

In November 2019, she apologised for an incident in 2014, in which she delivered a letter to her constituents where she expressed "delight" over canceled plans for accommodation for Irish Travellers in Newcastle, South Dublin.

At the general election in February, she was one of two Fine Gael candidates in Dublin Mid-West.  She won 4,487 first preference votes (9.87% of the total), just under half of the quota of 9,091 votes, but she gained a lot of transfers from both her Fine Gael running-mate Vicki Casserley and the independent candidate Paul Gogarty, and was elected on the 9th and final count. Following Higgins's election to the Dáil, Shirley O'Hara was co-opted to her seat on South Dublin County Council.

In May 2022, Higgins was widely criticised on social media for her "months-long campaign" and work with Simon Coveney to rename An Post's Passport Express service as Post Passport, as it wasn't quick enough. Critics described her video announcing the change as "tone deaf" and asked whether there were not more important issues for elected representatives to deal with. As a result she was ratioed on Twitter.

On 17 December 2022, Higgins seconded the uncontested nomination of Leo Varadkar as Taoiseach for his second term.

References

External links

Emer Higgins' page on the Fine Gael website

Living people
Year of birth missing (living people)
Fine Gael TDs
Members of the 33rd Dáil
21st-century women Teachtaí Dála
Local councillors in South Dublin (county)